Skate into Love is a 2020 Chinese television series based on the novel of the same name by Jiu Xiaoqi. It stars Janice Wu and Zhang Xincheng.  The series premiered on Jiangsu TV and Zhejiang TV on March 19, 2020.

Synopsis
A story about two childhood classmates, Li Yu Bing (Steven Zhang) and Tang Xue (Wu Qian), who share the same love for ice-skating. Li Yu Bing saw Tang Xue as a bully in elementary school, and later they are separated for some years. But their ice-skating careers take different paths. Li Yu Bing becomes a famous hockey player at his university, while Tang Xue gave up speed skating after an injury. When the two  coincidentally meet again when they go to the same university, Li Yu Bing takes the opportunity to seek revenge. Though, bit by bit, he sees that Tang Xue is not all bad as he thought, so he helps her fall back into love with the sport she gave up on. They eventually fall in love and face many obstacles on and off the ice together.

Cast
Janice Wu as Tang Xue
Zhangshang Mingzhu as Young Tang Xue 
Zhang Xincheng as Li Yubing
Li Chaoping as Young Li Yubing
Zhou Lijie as Yu Yan 
Chu Yue as Zhou Ran 
Cao Bo as Jiang Shijia 
He Xuanlin as Xia Menghuan 
Wei Tianhao as Bian Cheng 
Han Jiunuo as Zhang Yuewei 
Qin Tianyu as Liao Zhenyu 
Lu Junyao as Ye Liuying 
Xia Minghao as Coach Jin 
Li Zongrui

Special appearance 
Deng Lun as Xu Feng, "Ice God" (Ep 1, 36, 40) 
Wu Dajing as Himself (Ep 1, 40)

Production
The drama is produced by the team behind Ashes of Love. It is part two of "The Honey Trilogy" alongside Ashes of Love and Love When The Stars Fall.

On April 17, 2019, a filming ceremony was held at Qingdao to officially announce the start of principal photography. A 30 x 60 meters ice skating rink was built for the filming. Professional short track speed skaters were hired to serve as instructors for the cast members, and they also play supporting roles in the drama. Filming wrapped up on July 29, 2019.

Reception
The television series scored a 9.5 out of 10 on popular streaming site Viki. The drama was praised for its realistic skating scenes, light-hearted and humorous plot, and the chemistry between the main actors.

Soundtrack

Ratings 

 Highest ratings are marked in red, lowest ratings are marked in blue

References

Television series by Perfect World Pictures
Chinese romantic comedy television series
Chinese sports television series
Television shows based on Chinese novels
2020 Chinese television series debuts